is the Japanese fifth tier of league football, which is part of the Japanese Regional Leagues. It covers most of the Tōkai region, as well as the prefectures of Aichi, Shizuoka, Gifu and Mie.

2023 clubs 
 Division 1 

 Division 2

Tōkai Adult Soccer League Champions

References

Tōkai Soccer League website

Football leagues in Japan
Sports leagues established in 1966
1966 establishments in Japan